Bardach is a surname. Notable people with the surname include:

Ann Louise Bardach (born 1950), American journalist and author
Eugene Bardach, American public policy scholar
Georgina Bardach (born 1983), Argentine swimmer
Janusz Bardach (1919–2002), author and plastic surgeon
Juliusz Bardach (1914–2010), Polish legal historian